The following is a discography of the American independent record label Important Records and its sublabel Cassauna.

Important Records catalog
Note: All catalog numbers are prefixed with "imprec".

Cassauna catalog
All releases are cassettes printed in first editions of 50, with subsequent editions of 25 printed to fill reserved orders.

Note: All catalog numbers are prefixed with "SAUNA".

References

External links
Important Records homepage

Discographies of American record labels